Nuestra Belleza Coahuila 2012, was held at the Hotel Crowne Plaza of Torreón, Coahuila on July 5, 2012. At the conclusion of the final night of competition, Cecilia Vázquez from Saltillo was crowned the winner. Vázquez  was crowned by outgoing Nuestra Belleza Coahuila titleholder, Diana Ávila. Seven contestants competed for the state title.

Results

Placements

Special Awards

Judges
 Abril Cerbera – Fashion Designer
 Ivan Ramos – Plastic Surgeon
 Fernando Rosas – Esmas.com Representative
 Waldo Paredes – Image Designer
 Ana Karina Berlanga – Photographer
 Carlo Antonio Rico – Producer of Nuestra Belleza México
 Ana Laura Corral – Coordinator of Nuestra Belleza México

Background Music
Marconi

Contestants

References

External links
Official Website

Nuestra Belleza México